Christian D. Greeley is a former representative in the Maine state legislature. He was a Republican. He represented District 22 in the House of Representatives for four consecutive two-year terms, from 2002 to 2010, at which point he was prohibited from running again by term limits.

Career
Greeley was Cosmopolitan magazine's Bachelor-of-the-Month in June 1993, and as a result appeared (twice) on the John & Leeza Show, Sally Jesse Raphael Show, The Fox TV pilot for Carnie! and the movies Vacationland and A Sudden Loss of Gravity. While filming a TV show in Los Angeles, he was offered a job by Paramount Pictures. He's also had roles in small, local commercials. In October 2019, he was featured on a Fox News segment by host Dana Perino. In December 2022 he was featured on News Nation's Morning in America. He has been mentioned on national radio by Howie Carr, Lars Larson, Phil Hendrie, and others. He is former TV weatherman for both NBC and CBS stations. Greeley has appeared or been published in roughly a dozen national and regional magazines. He is the author of the CD, "From Terrified To Terrific! 7 Steps To Truly Fearless Public Speaking."

In June 2016, he was appointed by Governor Paul LePage to the Combat Sports Authority of Maine. Greeley attended Husson University and (was enrolled at) Mississippi State and is a graduate of Eastern Maine Community College and the Maine Criminal Justice Academy. He was a commencement speaker at Beal College, where he once also served on their Adjunct Faculty. He is a regular fill-in host on the radio for Blueberry Broadcasting.

In February 2021, he was recognized by the US Secret Service for his assistance with a visit to Maine by Donald Trump Jr. In 2016 he was Donald Trump's emcee, when he campaigned in Maine. Since 2015 he has been chief of the Holden, Maine Police Department.

Personal life
He is married to Donna (Gormley) Greeley  with one son.

Greeley is a former amateur boxer who also holds a first degree black belt in Kempo karate. He is a former Toughman Contest semi-finalist.

Death
According to the Bangor Daily News, "Christian "Chris" David Greeley passed away unexpectedly on March 9, 2023."

Notes

Living people
Republican Party members of the Maine House of Representatives
People from Levant, Maine
Year of birth missing (living people)